A Special from the Spectrum is the second video album by the American heavy metal band Dio, containing footage of a live concert performance recorded at The Spectrum arena in Philadelphia on 25 August 1984.
Most of the performance has been repackaged on the We Rock DVD, minus the opening track of "Stand Up and Shout". The video has been certified Gold by the RIAA having sold 50,000 units.

Track listing
"Stand Up and Shout" (Jimmy Bain, Ronnie James Dio)
"Don't Talk to Strangers" (Dio)
"Mystery" (Bain, Dio)
"Egypt (The Chains Are On)" (Vinny Appice, Bain, Vivian Campbell, Dio)
"Heaven and Hell" (Geezer Butler, Dio, Tony Iommi, Bill Ward)
Guitar solo by Vivian Campbell
"Heaven and Hell" (continued)
"The Last in Line" (Bain, Campbell, Dio)
"Rainbow in the Dark" (Appice, Bain, Campbell, Dio)
"The Mob Rules" (Butler, Dio, Iommi)
"We Rock" (Dio)

Band
Ronnie James Dio – Vocals
Vivian Campbell – Guitar
Jimmy Bain – Bass
Vinny Appice – Drums
Claude Schnell – Keyboards

Certifications

References

Dio (band) video albums
1984 video albums
Live video albums